Set Poppius, (11 October 1885 - 10 December 1972) was a Swedish journalist, editor and founder of the Poppius Journalistskola in Stockholm.

References

1885 births
1972 deaths
20th-century Swedish journalists